Pan American Airways Guided Missile Range Division (PAA GMRD) was a distinct division of Pan American World Airways in the period 1950-1980, responsible as prime contractor of the U.S. Air Force Eastern Test Range, based out of Patrick Air Force Base, Florida.  It was responsible for providing operations and maintenance for the Eastern Test Range, but subcontracted operation and maintenance of electronic equipment, such as missile tracking radars on the test range tracking ships and stations to the Missile Test Project of RCA Service Company (RCAS).

PAA GMRD operated under the direction of the U.S. Air Force, and retained operational offices within Patrick Air Force Base at what was then called the Tech Lab and at Building 423, and had administrative offices in Cocoa Beach, at 750 South Orlando Avenue.

Operational and technical personnel requiring travel to downrange sites boarded U.S. Air Force Military Air Transport Service (MATS) aircraft at Hangar 800 on Patrick Air Force Base. Travel by propeller-driven MATS planes was slow at the time. For example, travel by MATS to the South Atlantic Ocean tracking site at Ascension Island required three days of travel: Patrick Air Force Base to Suriname, with an overnight stay, then on to Recife, Brazil, with another overnight stay, and then, finally, the flight from Recife to Ascension Island. If traveling personnel were assigned to a tracking vessel awaiting their arrival in the Ascension Island area, it was necessary to then travel from Clarence Bay at Ascension Island to the vessel by means of motor whaleboat, barge, or other type of small craft, depending on boat schedule and sea condition.

Personnel returning from downrange passed through customs at the same hangar.

Further reading 
 Also:
1st revised edition (1967) 
2nd revised edition (1970) 
3rd edition, completely revised and updated (1973) 
5th edition (1975)

See also

 Pan American World Airways
 Eastern Test Range
 Western Test Range
 Missile Test Project
 Patrick Space Force Base, Florida
 List of ships of the United States Air Force

External links
 Satellite Applications to Marine Geodesy
 Acronyms: GMRD

Defunct companies based in Florida
Guided missiles
Pan Am